Innu-aimun or Montagnais is an Algonquian language spoken by over 10,000 Innu in Labrador and Quebec in Eastern Canada. It is a member of the Cree–Montagnais–Naskapi dialect continuum and is spoken in various dialects depending on the community.

Literature 

Since the 1980s, Innu-aimun has had considerable exposure in the popular culture of Canada and France due to the success of the rock music band Kashtin and the later solo careers of its founders Claude McKenzie and Florent Vollant. Widely heard hit songs with Innu-language lyrics have included "" ("Girl"), "" ("My Childhood"), "" ("Story") and in particular "" ("Take care of yourself"), which appeared on soundtrack compilations for the television series Due South and the documentary Music for The Native Americans. The lyrics of Akua Tuta are featured on over 50 websites, making this one of the most broadly accessible pieces of text written in any native North American language. Florent Vollant has also rendered several well-known Christmas carols into Innu in his 1999 album .

In 2013, "a comprehensive pan-Innu dictionary, covering all the Innu dialects spoken in Quebec and Labrador [was] published in Innu, English and French."

Phonology 
Innu-aimun has the following phonemes (written in IPA, with the standard orthography equivalents in angle brackets):

Consonants 

Vowels 
There are three pairs of so-called "long" and "short" vowels, and one long vowel with no short counterpart, though the length distinction is giving way to a place distinction.
The column titles here refer chiefly to the place of articulation of the long vowel.

Macron accent marks over the long vowels are omitted in general writing. e is not written with a macron because there is no contrasting short e.

Grammar 
Innu-aimun is a polysynthetic, head-marking language with relatively free word order. Its three basic parts of speech are nouns, verbs, and particles. Nouns are grouped into two genders, animate and inanimate, and may carry affixes indicating plurality, possession, obviation, and location. Verbs are divided into four classes based on their transitivity: animate intransitive (AI), inanimate intransitive (II), transitive inanimate (TI), and transitive animate (TA). Verbs may carry affixes indicating agreement (with both subject and object arguments), tense, mood, and inversion. Two different sets, or orders, of verbal affixes are used depending on the verb's syntactic context. In simple main clauses, the verb is marked using affixes of the independent order, whereas in subordinate clauses and content-word questions, affixes of the conjunct order are used.

Dialects 
Innu-aimun is related to East Cree ( – Northern/Coastal dialect and  – Southern/Inland dialect) spoken by the James Bay Cree of the James Bay region of Quebec and Ontario and the Atikamekw ( and ) of the Atikamekw in the upper Saint-Maurice River valley of Quebec. Innu-aimun is divided into four dialects – Southern Montagnais (Mashteuiatsh and Betsiamites), Eastern Montagnais (Mingan, Natashquan, La Romaine, Pakuashipi), Central Montagnais (Sept-Îles and Maliotenam, Matimekosh) and  Labrador -Montagnais (Sheshatshit). The speakers of the different dialects can communicate well with each other. The Naskapi language and culture are quite different from those of the Montagnais, in which the dialect changes from y to n as in  versus .

References
 Clarke, Sandra. 1982. North-West River (Sheshatshit) Montagnais: A grammatical sketch. National Museum of Man Mercury Series, 80. Ottawa: National Museums of Canada.
 Clarke, Sandra, and Marguerite MacKenzie. 2005. Montagnais/Innu-aimun (Algonquian). In Geert Booij et al. (eds.), Morphology: An international handbook on inflection and word formation, vol. 2, 1411–1421. Berlin; New York: Walter de Gruyter.
 Clarke, Sandra, and Marguerite MacKenzie. 2006. Labrador Innu-aimun: An introduction to the Sheshatshiu dialect. St. John's, Newfoundland: Department of Linguistics, Memorial University of Newfoundland.
 Drapeau, Lynn (1991) Dictionnaire montagnais-français. Québec: Presses de l'Université du Québec. 940 p.

Notes

External links

 Online pan-Innu dictionary
 Innu-aimun.ca Information about the language.
 Innu Aimun orthography and phonology (Languagegeek)
 Native Languages page for Montagnais Innu
 OLAC resources in and about the Montagnais language

+
Central Algonquian languages
Indigenous languages of the North American eastern woodlands
First Nations languages in Canada